Tabard Inn may refer to:

 United Kingdom

 The Tabard, Chiswick, London
 The Tabard, Southwark, London

 United States

 Tabard Inn (Washington, D.C.), listed on the National Register of Historic Places